Basai Datia is a village in the Datia district of Madhya Pradesh, India. The population is 2,521.

External links

References 

Villages in Datia district